Frankie Mariano (born 10 May 1987) is a retired Scotland international rugby league footballer who played as a  or .

He played for the Hull Kingston Rovers, the Wakefield Trinity Wildcats (Heritage № 1290), the Featherstone Rovers (Heritage № 982) (two spells, including the first on loan), the Castleford Tigers (Heritage № 945) and the Batley Bulldogs (loan) in the Betfred Championship

Background
Mariano was born in England and is of Scottish, American and Cape Verdean descent.

Playing career
Mariano made his first team début for the Hull Kingston Rovers in 2009 in the Challenge Cup round 5 victory over the Sheffield Eagles which the Hull Kingston Rovers won 34–24. 

He moved to Wakefield Trinity Wildcats in 2011 and spent three years at the club, before joining the Castleford Tigers in 2014. 

On 16 May 2014, Frankie's excellent form to start the season saw him sign a two-year deal to stay with the Tigers. 

He featured for the Castleford Tigers in the 2014 Challenge Cup Final defeat by the Leeds Rhinos at Wembley Stadium.

He featured in 2016 for the Castleford Tigers in the Super League. He previously played for the Hull Kingston Rovers and the Wakefield Trinity Wildcats.

References

External links

 (archived by web.archive.org) Featherstone Rovers profile
 (archived by web.archive.org) 2017 RLWC profile

1987 births
Living people
Batley Bulldogs players
Castleford Tigers players
Doncaster R.L.F.C. players
English people of American descent
English people of Cape Verdean descent
English people of Scottish descent
English rugby league players
Featherstone Rovers players
Hull Kingston Rovers players
Rugby league locks
Rugby league players from Kingston upon Hull
Rugby league props
Rugby league second-rows
Scotland national rugby league team players
Scottish people of American descent
Scottish people of Cape Verdean descent
Sheffield Eagles players
Wakefield Trinity players